Church station is an elevated rapid transit station in Philadelphia, Pennsylvania, served by SEPTA's Market-Frankford Line. It is located on Frankford Avenue between Ruan and Church streets in the Frankford neighborhood of Northeast Philadelphia. The station was originally named Ruan–Church station, and it is also served by SEPTA City Bus routes 3 and 5.

History
Church is part of the Frankford Elevated section of the line, which began service on November 5, 1922, as Ruan–Church station.

Between 1988 and 2003, SEPTA undertook a $493.3 million reconstruction of the  Frankford Elevated. Church station was completely rebuilt on the site of the original station; the project included new platforms, elevators, windscreens, and overpasses, and the station now meets ADA accessibility requirements. The line had originally been built with track ballast and was replaced with precast sections of deck, allowing the station (and the entire line) to remain open throughout the project.

During the Market–Frankford's rush-hour skip-stop service pattern, Church was only served by "B" trains. This practice was discontinued on February 24, 2020.

Station layout
There are two staircases at the station, with the main entrance on the west side of Frankford Avenue between Ruan and Church streets. Across the street is an eastbound platform exit-only staircase. South of the station, the tracks turn west to travel along Kensington Avenue.

References

External links

Images at NYCSubway.org
Station entrance from Google Maps Street View

SEPTA Market-Frankford Line stations
Railway stations in Philadelphia
Railway stations in the United States opened in 1922
Historic American Engineering Record in Philadelphia